The 2016 Elmbridge Borough Council election took place on 5 May 2016 to elect members of Elmbridge Borough Council in England. This was on the same day as other local elections. This election was held on new boundaries, with every seat up for election.

Ward Results

Claygate

Cobham and Downside

Esher

Hersham Village

Hinchley Wood and Weston Green

Long Ditton

Molesey East

Molesey West

Oatlands and Burwood Park

Oxshott and Stoke D'Abernon

Thames Ditton

Walton Central

Walton North

Walton South

Weybridge Riverside

Weybridge St George's Hill

References

2016 English local elections
2016
2010s in Surrey